Mir Khavand-e Sofla (also Romanized as Mīr Khavānd-e Soflá and Mīr Khovand-e Soflá; also known as Mīr Khvān-e Pā’īn, Mīr Khovān-e Pā’īn, Mīr Khovān Pā’īn, and Mīr Khūnd-e Pā’īn) is a village in Khandan Rural District, Tarom Sofla District, Qazvin County, Qazvin Province, Iran. At the 2006 census, its population was 218, in 54 families.

References 

Populated places in Qazvin County